Middle of Nowhere may refer to:

Places
 A remote or rural location, for example, "the boonies"
 Nutt, New Mexico, which has called itself the Middle of Nowhere

Books
 The Middle of Nowhere, a Dragonlance novel by Paul B. Thompson
 The Middle of Nowhere, a Star Wolf novel by David Gerrold

Films
 Middle of Nowhere (2008 film), a coming-of-age comedy-drama film
 Middle of Nowhere (2012 film), directed by Ava DuVernay

Music

Albums
 Middle of Nowhere (album), a 1997 album by Hanson
 Middle of Nowhere Acoustic, a 2007 live acoustic album and DVD also by Hanson
 The Middle of Nowhere (Orbital album), 1999
 The Middle of Nowhere (Circle II Circle album), 2005
 The Middle of Nowhere, a 2000 album by Future Loop Foundation
 In the Middle of Nowhere, a 1986 album by Modern Talking

Songs
 "In the Middle of Nowhere", a 1965 song by Dusty Springfield
 "Middle of Nowhere" (song), by Hot Hot Heat
 "Middle of Nowhere", a song by Selena Gomez & the Scene from their third album When the Sun Goes Down
 "Middle of Nowhere", a song by The Blank Theory from their 2002 album Beyond the Calm of the Corridor
 "Middle of Nowhere" (Felix Sandman song)
 "Middle of Nowhere" (Stone Temple Pilots song)